The Greater Boston Track Club (usually abbreviated GBTC), a nonprofit organization, was founded in 1973 in Boston, Massachusetts to provide coaching for runners looking to remain competitive beyond their collegiate running careers.

During the past 30 years, the club has provided coaching and support to Olympic qualifiers, Boston Marathon victors, national cross-country champions, and national and world championship participants. It has also offered runners of all ages and abilities the opportunity to achieve their personal and team goals.

GBTC's current main sponsor is Saucony.

Mission statement
The Greater Boston Track Club provides a friendly, competitive, team-oriented environment to those who compete at the national, regional, and local levels. Financial support may be provided to teams and individuals to compete at major events. The club promotes events in track and field both indoors and outdoors, road racing, and cross-country. A structured training program is provided in the form of team practices under the guidance of experienced coaches.  GBTC has three year-round coaches for various disciplines.

Sponsored events
GBTC Indoor Track and Field Invitational - Annually held in January at Harvard Indoor Track, Cambridge, MA
GBTC Cross-country Invitational - Annually held in September at Elm Bank Park, Wellesley, MA

Notable alumni
List of notable Greater Boston Track Club athletes and coaches
 Ayanna Alexander
 Tim Bayley - World Championships qualifier
 Bruce Bickford - Olympian, Ranked #1 in the world at the 10,000m
 Tom Derderian - Long time coach, USATF NE President, 2-time Olympic Trials qualifier, author of two books on the marathon
 Stanley Egbor - 6-time All-American sprinter
 Jack Fultz - 3-time top 10 finisher at the Boston Marathon, 2:11 PR in the marathon
 Bob Hodge - Top 5 finish at the Boston Marathon
 Samyr Laine
 Jack MacDonald - Founder of GBTC, Athletic Director at Quinnipiac
 Dick Mahoney - Top 10 Boston Marathon finish
 Glen Mays - Winner of the Cape Cod Marathon
 Greg Meyer
 Pete Pfitzinger - 2-time Olympian in the marathon
 Anna Pierce - 2-time Olympian, World Championships qualifier
 Bill Rodgers
 Ruben Sanca - 2-time NCAA All-American, World Championships qualifier, Olympian
 Alberto Salazar - 3-time New York City Marathon Champion, Boston Marathon Champion
 Bob Sevene - GBTC Coach and coach of many famous athletes including Joan Benoit, Cathy O'Brien, Mark Coogan
 Sloan Siegrist - Olympian
 Bill Squires - 3-time All-American miler, coach of many top 10 finishes in the Boston Marathon
 Randy Thomas - Top 5 finish at the Boston Marathon, 2:11 PR in the marathon
 Sherita Williams - Olympic Trials in the triple jump
 Daniel Hutcherson - Olympic Trials Qualifier in the triple jump

External links
Greater Boston Track Club website
USA Track and Field website

1973 establishments in Massachusetts
Clubs and societies in Massachusetts
Non-profit organizations based in Massachusetts
Sports clubs established in 1973
Sports in Boston
Track and field clubs in the United States
Track and field in Massachusetts